Genon is a Russian knowledge market public resource, stimulating knowledge gathering in the form of answers to questions and providing convenient retrieval of information. Genon technology allows a person to quickly and comfortably find needed information, as well as opening up new solutions in natural language processing in computer.

Genon features
An important component of the project is the realization of opportunities to answer the question by everyone, as well as a system of cash rewards to authors and editors of answers, which directly depends on the popularity of the material. This part of the project is an independent software solution that is present in the Runet,  par with similar question and answer services, associated with the largest search engine - Mail.ru (answers service Otvet@Mail.ru), Google (Google Questions and Answers).

The sites mentioned in the answers are indexed on the questions, answers to which can be found in the information published on these resources. Such a decision is a logical evolution of cataloguing, helping to avoid subjectivism in the directory structure creation. In fact, the directory structure is dynamically formed based on the user's query.

External links
  Genon Portal

Knowledge markets
Russian websites